The Hôpital des Enfants-Trouvés was an institution of Paris established to take care of abandoned children. It was founded by Vincent de Paul in 1638.

See also 

 Child abandonment
 Foundling hospital

External link 
 Les Enfants-Trouvés (1831); by André Delrieu

Hospitals in Paris

Child welfare
Adoption, fostering, orphan care and displacement
1638 in France